The 1880 Rhode Island gubernatorial election was held on April 7, 1880. Republican nominee Alfred H. Littlefield defeated Democratic nominee Horace A. Kimball with 44.82% of the vote.

General election

Candidates
Major party candidates
Alfred H. Littlefield, Republican
Horace A. Kimball, Democratic

Other candidates
Albert C. Howard, Independent Republican

Results

References

1880
Rhode Island
Gubernatorial